Pumelela Matshikwe (born 19 June 1984) is a South African former first-class cricketer who played for the Highveld Lions cricket team. In August 2016, he was given a ten-year ban by Cricket South Africa for his involvement in match fixing during the 2015–16 Ram Slam T20 Challenge tournament. In June 2022, he was given a six-year jail sentence, which was suspended for five years, for his part in the match fixing.

References

External links
 

1984 births
Living people
South African cricketers
Lions cricketers
Cricketers from Johannesburg
Cricketers banned for corruption